Aufidia can refer to:
 Aufidia gens, an ancient Roman gens
 the name once thought to belong to Alfidia, the mother of Roman empress Livia